Formby Power Station railway station was a railway station on the Liverpool, Crosby and Southport Railway, situated south of Hogshill Lane and just north of the River Alt.

History
The railway station opened circa 1917 as a small halt for employees of the nearby power station at Formby, a railway installation generating electric current for the Liverpool–Southport line. The halt was closed in around 1944 and the power station closed down in 1946, though the line remains open and is used by trains on the Merseyrail Northern Line.

The power station building was later used by Metal Closures Rosslite Limited as a factory producing expanded polystyrene packaging and insulation products, and then as a business centre. The site eventually became derelict but plans were later announced to convert it for residential use.

The power station was demolished in 2016, the whole site was levelled and work started on a new housing development, leaving no trace of the original buildings. Development of the site was completed in August 2016, including a new access road connecting the site with Park Road. The roads on the new development were named after some of the pioneers in the field of electricity: Callan Crescent, Edison Close, Gilbert Close, Tesla Way, and Wheatstone Road. In February 2017, a gate was installed on Hoggs Hill Lane to prevent vehicular access to the site via the original route.

References

Sources
  and Avon Anglia Publications, .

External links
Formby Power Station - Formby Civic Society
Science and Society Picture Library - Search for "Formby Power Station".

Disused railway stations in the Metropolitan Borough of Sefton
Former Lancashire and Yorkshire Railway stations
Railway stations in Great Britain opened in 1917
Railway stations in Great Britain closed in 1944